Glyphipterix voluptella is a species of sedge moth in the genus Glyphipterix. It was described by Felder in 1875. It is found in Brazil.

References

Moths described in 1875
Glyphipterigidae
Moths of South America